Harry Hood (c. 1926 – May 18, 1954) was a Canadian football player who played for the Calgary Stampeders and Winnipeg Blue Bombers. He won the Grey Cup with the Stampeders in 1948, who went undefeated that year. He previously played junior football in Winnipeg. His number 5 is retired by the Stampeders.

References

1920s births
1954 deaths
Calgary Stampeders players
Winnipeg Blue Bombers players
Canadian football running backs
Canadian football people from Winnipeg
Players of Canadian football from Manitoba
Canadian football quarterbacks